Leslie Cummings is an American government official who served as acting Oregon Secretary of State from February 26, 2019 to March 31, 2019.

Personal life
Cummings is Christian. She has written two novels about horses, and co-owns a racehorse with her sister.

Career
In 2012, Cummings worked as an IT manager in the Oregon Employment Department. At the time, Cummings' husband, Bob Cummings, was working as an IT analyst for the Legislative Fiscal Office. Cummings' husband was later the subject of an ethics complaint. In 2013, Cummings resigned from her position at the OED. After Dennis Richardson was elected Oregon Secretary of State in 2016, he appointed Cummings to serve as deputy secretary of state.

Cummings had previously assumed the duties of Secretary of State during Richardson's treatment for brain cancer. Cummings served in the position for one month after Richardson's death, after which politician Bev Clarno was selected to serve until the 2020 Oregon Secretary of State election. After Clarno took office, Cummings and other members of the Secretary of States's Executive Office were forced to resign.

References

Latter Day Saints from Oregon
Living people
Oregon Republicans
Politicians from Eugene, Oregon
Secretaries of State of Oregon
Year of birth missing (living people)